Boulainvilliers is a station in line C of the Paris Region's express suburban rail system, the RER. It is in the 16th arrondissement of Paris. Boulainvilliers was originally an open air station. The platforms were covered when the line was converted to the RER C. La Muette on Paris Métro Line 9 is connected to the RER station via an underground passageway.

See also
 List of stations of the Paris RER
 List of stations of the Paris Métro

External links

 

Buildings and structures in the 16th arrondissement of Paris
Railway stations in France opened in 1900
Réseau Express Régional stations
Railway stations in Paris